Exormotheca is a group of liverworts in the family Exormothecaceae. It was described as a genus in 1870.

Species

 Exormotheca bischlerae Furuki & Higuchi - China
 Exormotheca bulbigena Bornefeld, O.H. Volk & R. Wolf - Namibia
 Exormotheca bullosa (Stephani) K. Müller - Portugal
 Exormotheca ceylonensis Meijer - Sri Lanka
 Exormotheca holstii Steph. - Namibia, South Africa
 Exormotheca pustulosa Mitt. - Oman, Yemen, Saudi Arabia, United Arab Emirates, St. Helena, Mexico, Tanzania, Canary Islands, Spain, France, Portugal
 Exormotheca welwitschii Steph. - Algarve

References 

Marchantiales
Marchantiales genera